Këshilla (literally meaning "Council" in Albanian) was an Albanian administration in Thesprotia, Greece, during the Axis occupation of Greece (1941-1944). It was set up during the Fascist Italian occupation with the aim of annexing the Greek region into a greater Albanian state and continued its operations under Nazi German occupation until the defeat of Axis Powers and the end of World War II. This initiative was undertaken by the Cham Albanian leaders of the Dino family, in particular the brothers Nuri and Mazar Dino, who "trapped" the majority of the Cham community into supporting the council. The policy of ethnic cleansing perpetrated by the Këshilla and other paramilitary organisations under the Dino clan was used as justification by the EDES resistance forces at the end of the war to expel the Muslim Cham community from the region, with the exception of small groups who had joined the EDES guerillas.

Këshilla was part of the Cham Albanian collaboration with the Axis during the Second World War.

Background

Following the Italian invasion of Albania, the Albanian Kingdom became a protectorate of the Kingdom of Italy. The Italians, especially governor Francesco Jacomoni, used the Cham issue as a means to rally Albanian support. As the final excuse for the start of the Greco-Italian War, Jacomoni used the killing of a Cham Albanian leader Daut Hoxha, whose headless body was discovered near the village of Vrina in June 1940. It was alleged by the Italian-controlled government in Tirana that he had been murdered by Greek secret agents. Hoxha was a military leader of the Cham struggle during the inter-war years, leading to him being branded as a bandit by the Greek government.

Këshilla
In October 1940, the Greek authorities disarmed 1,800 Cham conscripts and put them to work on local roads. in the following month, after the Italian invasion, they seized all Albanian males not called up and deported them to camps or to island exile. Under these circumstances, as Italy managed to control Greece after the German invasion, several hundred Cham Albanians formed a local administration called Këshilla in 1942. These armed bands took part alongside the German army in burning Greek villages. The local beys and the mufti did not support such actions. In 1943, this organization was completed with its own armed forces as well as a gendarmerie.

Although the Italians wanted to annex Chameria to Albania, the Germans vetoed the proposal. An Albanian High Commissioner, Xhemil Dino, was appointed, but his authority was limited, and for the duration of the Occupation, the area remained under direct control from the military authorities in Athens.

See also
Axis occupation of Greece during World War II
Expulsion of Cham Albanians
Cham issue

References

Further reading
 
 
 

Cham Albanians
Epirus in World War II
1942 establishments in Greece